John Carl West Sr. (August 27, 1922 – March 21, 2004) was an American Democratic Party politician who served as the 109th governor of South Carolina from 1971 to 1975. From 1977 to 1981, he was the United States ambassador to Saudi Arabia.

Background
West was born in Camden, South Carolina. He was raised in the Kershaw County farming community of Charlotte Thompson. In May 1923, his father, along with 76 other people, was killed in a fire at the nearby Cleveland School. His mother and maternal grandmother escaped unharmed from the fire. West was thereafter raised by his mother.

In 1942, he married his childhood sweetheart, Lois Rhame. The couple had a daughter and two sons.

That same year, he graduated from The Citadel in Charleston, South Carolina, and enlisted in the United States Army as a major, an intelligence officer, during World War II, assigned to stateside service.

Political career
Following the war, West earned a law degree in 1948 from the University of South Carolina in the capital city of Columbia. From 1948 to 1952, he served on the South Carolina Highway Commission. In 1954, he coordinated the unsuccessful U.S. Senate candidacy of Edgar A. Brown, who lost in a write-in campaign waged by former Governor Strom Thurmond, then a Democrat but in 1964 a defector to the Republican Party.

From 1955 to 1967, West served in the state senate from Kershaw County. At the time he was a segregationist but felt uncomfortable denying basic rights to African Americans and by the time he was lieutenant governor was a "southern moderate" on racial issues. He was assigned to several committees which studied public school curriculum, investigated the activities of the Communist Party of the United States of America, monitored the state Development Board, examined state support for the nursing profession and junior colleges, and recommended revisions to the state constitution.

West was the 80th Lieutenant Governor of South Carolina, having served from 1967 to 1971. Elected lieutenant governor in November 1966, he and Robert Evander McNair, the governor, and Ernest Hollings, a former governor elected to a long-term stint in the U.S. Senate, succeeded in thwarting Strom Thurmond's daring attempt to stampede the white electorate of their native state from a century of Democratic hegemony into the Republican Party, which had prevailed in South Carolina in 1964 at the presidential level for the first time since the disputed election of 1876. Thurmond nevertheless won his first term as a Republican in that same general election. The GOP had also made a strong presidential bid in the state in 1960, but John F. Kennedy defeated Richard M. Nixon for the state's electoral votes that year.

In the 1970 gubernatorial election, in which McNair was constitutionally barred from seeking a second full term, West with 53.2 percent of the vote defeated U.S. Representative Albert W. Watson, a Democrat-turned-Republican who carried Thurmond's backing. Watson finished with 45.9 percent of the ballots cast. A former state legislator, Alfred W. Bethea of Dillon, polled 2 percent of the vote as the nominee of George Wallace's former American Independent Party. West's running-mate for lieutenant governor, Earle Morris Jr., of Pickens defeated Watson's running mate, advertising executive James M. Henderson of Greenville, by about the same percent of the vote as West had prevailed over Watson.

As governor, West was known for his accessibility with the media and his openness with legislators. In carrying out his duties, he kept a recurring eye on history and left much archival material for future researchers. He worked to increase employment opportunities in the state. The Orangeburg Times and Democrat wrote that West's "greatest single success was in the field of economic growth. ... With the state's growing income and new jobs, the historic trend of out-migration ... was halted. Under West, South Carolina in October 1971 held its first ever integrated state fair in Columbia. On March 28, 1973, the South Carolina Legislature ratified an amendment to the state constitution that allowed restaurants to serve mixed drinks.

After his tenure as governor, West returned for two years to private law practice until he was appointed the ambassador to Saudi Arabia, a position that he held during the Jimmy Carter administration. Newly appointed as ambassador to Saudi Arabia, West outlined his plan to Dee Workman, a high-ranking Mobil Oil executive, who reported directly to William Tavoulareas, to encourage communication between the public and private sectors of both the U.S. and Saudi Arabia. He began by setting up visits by members of Congress, including Senator Jacob Javits, to allow them to see firsthand the "problems and opportunities" of the Saudi economy. In his 1997 oral history, West commented on his strategy of helping the Saudis with their image: "It didn't take a rocket scientist or a smart fellow to realize the public relations of the Arab world was just nonexistent." In a five-point formula for potential peace in the region, Carter endorsed proposals for the creation of a Palestinian state, an issue opposed by conservatives. A leading Jewish Democratic Party contributor said that West was more "the Saudis' ambassador to the United States", rather than the U.S. ambassador to Saudi Arabia, as he had been appointed.

Death and legacy

After returning to the United States, he became a Professor of Middle Eastern Studies at the University of South Carolina.  He endowed a professorship at The Citadel, which currently resides in The Citadel School of Humanities and Social Sciences. From 1993 until his death from cancer in 2004 at Hilton Head Island, he was a partner in the law firm of Bethea, Jordan, and Griffin. He was Presbyterian.

Philip G. Grose, a former staff member for both Governors McNair and West and later a research associate at the University of South Carolina's Institute for Southern Studies, wrote a 2011 biography of West entitled Looking for Utopia: The Life and Times of John C. West. Grose took the "looking for Utopia" line from McNair, who once described his friend and colleague West as "an idealist ... always looking for Utopia". Grose depicts West as a determined statesman who shaped his career by championing causes of the underprivileged in a state with more than its share of poverty and denied opportunities to many of its citizens. Grose concludes that West "was right about a lot of things, as it turned out, and his Utopian quest left a permanent, undeniable, and irreversible impact on a state whose residents ordinarily did not like the idea of change."

John "Jack" West, III called his father "a combination of John C. Calhoun and Atticus Finch."

References

External links
John West: In His Own Words at University of South Carolina, South Carolina Political Collections
John Carl West Papers at South Carolina Political Collections, University of South Carolina
Governor John C. West Collection at the South Carolina Department of Archives & History (RG 552000)
1971 John C. West Inaugural Parade and Swearing in Ceremony on South Carolina Educational Television

1922 births
2004 deaths
Democratic Party South Carolina state senators
Lieutenant Governors of South Carolina
Democratic Party governors of South Carolina
University of South Carolina faculty
University of South Carolina trustees
University of South Carolina School of Law alumni
University of South Carolina alumni
Ambassadors of the United States to Saudi Arabia
People from Camden, South Carolina
The Citadel, The Military College of South Carolina alumni
United States Army officers
United States Army personnel of World War II
Presbyterians from South Carolina
Deaths from cancer in South Carolina
20th-century American politicians